Harrison James Reed (born 27 January 1995) is an English professional footballer who currently plays as a defensive midfielder for  club Fulham.

Club career

Southampton
Reed made his professional debut for Southampton on 27 August 2013 against Barnsley at Oakwell in which he came on in the 81st minute for Jay Rodriguez as Southampton secured a 5–1 victory in the second round of the League Cup. On 7 December 2013, he made his Premier League debut for Southampton against Manchester City at St Mary's Stadium, replacing Steven Davis in the final minute of a 1–1 draw. He made his first Premier League start on 20 December 2014, in a 3–0 victory over Everton, playing the full 90 minutes.

Reed made 30 first team appearances for the club, including playing in Europa League games against Vitesse Arnhem.

Loan to Norwich City
On 5 July 2017, Reed joined Norwich City on a season-long loan deal. He made his debut for the club on 5 August 2017, in a 1–1 draw against Fulham at Craven Cottage. He scored his first career goal in a 2–0 win against Queens Park Rangers on 16 August 2017.

Reed was a regular fixture, started 36 league games for the club.

Loan to Blackburn Rovers
On 27 August 2018, Reed joined Blackburn Rovers on a season-long loan. He made his debut in a 1-1 draw against Aston Villa on 15 September 2018. He bagged his first goal for the club in a 3-2 win against Stoke City on 22 September.

He made 33 appearances for the club, scoring three goals.

Loan to Fulham
On 8 August 2019, Reed was loaned out to Fulham for the 2019–20 season, and helped the team to promotion from the Sky Bet Championship. He made his debut in a 2–0 win against his former side Blackburn Rovers on 10 August 2019.

Fulham
On 30 August 2020, Reed joined Fulham on a permanent basis for an undisclosed fee until the summer of 2024, with an option to extend by a further year. The transfer fee was reported to be £6million. On 16 September 2022 Reed scored his first goal for Fulham in a 3-2 victory over Nottingham Forest at the City Ground. This was Fulham's first away victory of the season.

Career statistics

Honours
Southampton
U21 Premier League Cup: 2014–15

Fulham
EFL Championship: 2021–22
EFL Championship play-offs: 2020

References

External links
Profile at the Fulham F.C. website
England profile at The FA

1995 births
Living people
Sportspeople from Worthing
English footballers
Association football midfielders
Southampton F.C. players
Norwich City F.C. players
Blackburn Rovers F.C. players
Fulham F.C. players
Premier League players
English Football League players
England youth international footballers